ABW, or abw, may refer to:

Arts and media
 ABW, a 2001 album by Addis Black Widow
 ABW (TV station), the Australian Broadcasting Corporation's Perth TV station

Technology
 Abandonware, software no longer supported by its owner
 AbiWord, word processor
 Advanced Brake Warning, in vehicle safety systems

Transportation
 ABW, National Rail code for Abbey Wood railway station in London, UK
 ABW, IATA  code for Abau Airport, Papua New Guinea
 Advanced Brake Warning, in vehicle safety systems 
 AirBridgeCargo, a Russian cargo airline

Other
 ABW, the ISO 3166-1 alpha-3 country code for Aruba
 abw, the ISO 639-3 code the Pal language, a Papuan language of Papua New Guinea
 Activity Based Working, workplace strategy that provides people with a choice of settings for their work activities
 Agencja Bezpieczeństwa Wewnętrznego, the Polish internal security agency, also known as ISA 
 Alcohol by weight, used by some brewers instead of Alcohol by volume (ABV)
 Australian Bird Watcher, an ornithological journal

See also